Scopula coniaria is a moth of the family Geometridae. It was described by Prout in 1913. It is found in Japan and Russia.

Subspecies
Scopula coniaria coniaria
Scopula coniaria okinawensis Prout, 1920 (Okinawa)

References

Moths described in 1913
Moths of Japan
Moths of Asia
coniaria
Taxa named by Louis Beethoven Prout